Francesco Morgioni (1 September 1661 – 18 November 1712) was a Roman Catholic prelate who served as Bishop of Minori (1705–1712) and Bishop of Ruvo (1698–1705).

Biography
Francesco Morgioni was born in Ischia, Italy on 1 September 1661.
He was ordained a deacon on 27 December 1688 and ordained a priest on 28 December 1688.
On 19 December 1698, he was appointed during the papacy of Pope Innocent XII as Bishop of Ruvo.
On 21 December 1698, he was consecrated bishop by Sebastiano Antonio Tanara, Cardinal-Priest of Santi Quattro Coronati, with Tommaso Guzzoni, Bishop of Sora, and Domenico Belisario de Bellis, Bishop of Molfetta, serving as co-consecrators. 
On 18 May 1705, he was appointed during the papacy of Pope Clement XI as Bishop of Minori.
He served as Bishop of Minori until his death on 18 November 1712.

References

External links and additional sources
 (for Chronology of Bishops) 
 (for Chronology of Bishops) 
 (for Chronology of Bishops) 
 (for Chronology of Bishops) 

17th-century Italian Roman Catholic bishops
18th-century Italian Roman Catholic bishops
Bishops appointed by Pope Innocent XII
Bishops appointed by Pope Clement XI
1661 births
1712 deaths